Hassalstrongylus lichtenfelsi is a nematode worm of the genus Hassalstrongylus that infects the marsh rice rat (Oryzomys palustris) in Florida. The females cannot be distinguished from those of the other species in the marsh rice rat, H. forresteri and H. musculi.

See also 
 List of parasites of the marsh rice rat

References

Literature cited 
Diaw, Oumar Talla, 1976. Contribution à l'étude de nematodes Trichostrongyloidea parasites de xenarthre, marsupiaux et rongeurs neotropicaux. Bulletin du Muséum National d'Histoire Naturelle de Paris (Zoologie) 282:1065–1089. 
Durette-Desset, Marie-Claude, 1974. Nippostrongylinae (Nematoda: Heligmosomidae) néarctiques. Annales de Parasitologie Humaine et Comparée 49(4):435–450.
Kinsella, J.M. 1988. Comparison of helminths of rice rats, Oryzomys palustris, from freshwater and saltwater marshes in Florida. Proceedings of the Helminthological Society of Washington 55(2):275–280.

Nematodes described in 1974
Heligmonellidae
Parasitic nematodes of mammals
Parasites of rodents